The 6.5mm Remington Magnum is a .264 caliber (6.7 mm) belted bottlenecked cartridge introduced in 1966. The cartridge is based on a necked down .350 Remington Magnum which on turn is based on a shortened, necked down, blown out .375 H&H Magnum case. The cartridge was one of the first short magnum cartridges.

General information
The 6.5 mm (.264 caliber) has been extremely popular in Europe and especially in the Scandinavian countries and this trend continues today. The 6.5x52mm Carcano, 6.5x53mmR (.256 Mannlicher), 6.5x54mm Mannlicher-Schönauer, 6.5×55mm Swedish Mauser, 6.5×58mmR Krag–Jørgensen and the 6.5×58mm Portuguese are among these cartridges of originally military European origin. What the 6.5 mm (.264 caliber) bullets offered was excellent sectional density and ballistic coefficients. The Scandinavian countries dominated the Olympics in the Nordic events shooting 6.5 mm center fire cartridges like the 6.5×55mm until 1972 when the centerfire shooting events were dropped. However, in North America the .264 caliber did not make much of a head way in terms of popularity. Beginning in the 1950s several ex-service Norwegian Krag–Jørgensen and Swedish Mauser began trickling into the United States. Winchester had designed the .264 Winchester Magnum but it did not gain much of a following and the rifles were plagued by short barrel lives.

In 1966 Remington introduced the 6.5 Remington Magnum, which was based upon the previous years' .350 Remington Magnum, in the 18.5 inch barrel Model 600 carbine. This was poor choice of rifle by Remington as it was unable to exploit the performance potential of the 6.5mm Remington. While Remington did later chamber the cartridge in the 24 inch Model 700 rifle, the damage was already done to the cartridge's reputation. Damage from which it would never fully recover, and eventually it passed into obsolesce. Attempts have been made to revive the cartridge by Ruger and then again by Remington in 2004 in the Model 673 Guide Rifle but these attempts at revival have been unsuccessful.

The 6.5mm Remington Magnum remains an excellent rifle cartridge with a greater performance potential over all the European 6.5mm cartridges save the 6.5x68mm RWS which is similar to the .264 Winchester Magnum. Furthermore, due to its short stature, it can be chambered in lighter, quicker handling short action rifles. On account of the case capacity of the cartridge a barrel with a minimum length of 24 inches is necessary to realize the potential of the cartridge. With shorter barrels performance level drop dramatically especially when slower burning powders are utilized.

Currently Remington no longer produces ammunition for the cartridge.

Cartridge specifications
The 6.5mm Remington Magnum is based on the .350 Remington Magnum necked down to accept a .264 caliber (6.71mm) bullet. It was one of the original short, fat magnum cartridges to be put into production. The short, fat cartridge design is known to promote efficient powder burning characteristics.

The SAAMI recommends a 6 groove barrel with a 1:9 twist.

Performance
Remington is the only company that provides ammunition for the cartridge. They provide a single load, the  PSP-CL. This Remington factory ammunition with its light for caliber bullet is only recommended for small deer and predator species. Those wishing to take advantage of the versatility of the 6.5mm Remington Magnum have little choice but to handload their ammunition.

The 6.5 mm Remington Magnum compares favorably with other 6.5mm (.264 caliber) cartridges. It terms of energy it is bested by the 6.5x68mm RWS and the .264 Winchester Magnum. However, neither the 6.5x68mm RWS nor the .264 Winchester Magnum can be chambered in a short action rifle. It provides a leap in performance over the non-magnum cartridges such as the .260 Remington and 6.5×55mm Swedish.

See also
List of rifle cartridges
Table of handgun and rifle cartridges

References

Pistol and rifle cartridges
Remington Magnum rifle cartridges